The Democratic Agrarian Party of Romania (PDAR) was a political party in Romania.

History 

The PDAR was formed on 29 January 1990 as a competitor to the Christian Democratic National Peasants' Party (PNȚCD). In the transitional government led by Petre Roman, PDAR member Nicolae Ștefan was Minister of Agriculture. The party received 1.8% of the Chamber of Deputies vote in the 1990 general elections, winning nine seats. It also received 1.6% of the vote in the Senate elections, but failed to win a seat.

Despite increasing its Chamber vote share in the 1992 general elections to 3%, it failed to win a seat. However, it won five seats in the Senate with 3.3% of the vote. It contested the 1996 elections as part of the National Union of the Centre alliance, alongside the Ecological Movement of Romania (MER) and the Humanist Party (PC). However, the alliance received only 0.9% of the vote, failing to win a seat. In 1998, the PDAR merged with the New Romania Party to form the Romanian National Party.

Electoral history

Legislative elections

References

Defunct political parties in Romania
Political parties established in 1990
Political parties disestablished in 1998
1990 establishments in Romania
1998 disestablishments in Romania